Gerd Egger (born 8 October 1943) is a German judoka. He competed in the men's middleweight event at the 1972 Summer Olympics.

References

External links
 

1943 births
Living people
German male judoka
Olympic judoka of West Germany
Judoka at the 1972 Summer Olympics
People from Lindau
Sportspeople from Swabia (Bavaria)